Tmesisternus wauensis is a species of beetle in the family Cerambycidae. It was described by Gressitt in 1984. It was described by Papua New Guinea.

References

wauensis
Beetles described in 1984